Antona variana is a moth of the subfamily Arctiinae first described by Arthur Gardiner Butler in 1877. It is found in the Amazon basin.

References

Lithosiini
Moths described in 1877
Moths of South America